Bunn Creek is a river that flows into the Mohawk River in Amsterdam, New York.

References 

Rivers of Montgomery County, New York
Mohawk River
Rivers of New York (state)